, abbreviated as Fabiniku (ファ美肉) is a Japanese manga series written by Yū Tsurusaki and illustrated by Shin Ikezawa. It has been serialized online via Cygames' Cycomi manga app and website since November 2019 and has been collected in eight tankōbon volumes by Shogakukan. An anime television series adaptation produced by OLM aired from January to March 2022.

Characters

Media

Manga
The manga series is written by Yū Tsurusaki and illustrated by Shin Ikezawa. It has been serialized online via Cygames' manga website Cycomi since November 18, 2019. Shogakukan is publishing the series in tankōbon volumes. The first volume was released on April 17, 2020. As of November 2022, eight volumes have been released. In North America, the manga is licensed by Seven Seas Entertainment.

Volume list

Anime
An anime television series adaptation was announced on May 17, 2021. It is produced by OLM and directed by Sayaka Yamai, with Toshimitsu Takeuchi handling the series' scripts, Aoi Yamato designing the characters, and Takeshi Watanabe composing the music. It aired from January 12 to March 30, 2022, on TV Tokyo and BS TV Tokyo. The opening theme song is "Akatsuki no Salaryman" (Salaryman at Dawn) by Yoshiki Fukuyama, while the ending theme song is "FA'NTASY to!" by Luce Twinkle Wink. Crunchyroll licensed the series outside of Asia. Medialink licensed the series in Southeast Asia, South Asia, and Oceania minus Australia and New Zealand.

On July 20, 2022, Crunchyroll announced that the series will receive an English dub, which premiered the following day.

Episode list

Reception
The series ranked 19th in the 2020 Next Manga Award in the web manga category.

Notes

References

External links
  
 

2022 anime television series debuts
Anime series based on manga
Comedy anime and manga
Crunchyroll anime
Cygames franchises
Fiction about reincarnation
Isekai anime and manga
Japanese webcomics
LGBT in anime and manga
Medialink
OLM, Inc.
Seven Seas Entertainment titles
Shogakukan manga
Shōnen manga
Transgender in anime and manga
TV Tokyo original programming
Webcomics in print